The Bon Aqua Springs Historic District near Bon Aqua, Tennessee is a  historic district which was listed on the National Register of Historic Places in 1990.  The listing included six contributing buildings, seven contributing structures, and a contributing site.

The district includes remnants of the resort, including houses, spring houses, a cottage, a corn crib, bridges, a dam, a swimming pool, and a reservoir.

References

Springs of Tennessee
Historic districts on the National Register of Historic Places in Tennessee
National Register of Historic Places in Hickman County, Tennessee